Israel–Italy relations refers to the foreign relations between the State of Israel and the Italian Republic. Italy recognized Israel on 8 February 1949, after the Declaration of the Establishment of the State of Israel on 14 May 1948.
Italy has an embassy in Tel Aviv, two consulate-generals in West Jerusalem and East Jerusalem, and 4 honorary consulates in Beersheba, Eilat, Haifa and Nazareth. The Italian ambassador in Israel since 2021 is Sergio Barbanti. Israel has an embassy in Rome and the current Israeli Ambassador is Dror Eydar. Both countries are members of the Union for the Mediterranean.

History

Jews in Italy 

The pre-war Jewish population of Italy amounted to 58,500 (46,500 by Jewish religion and 12,000 converted or non-Jewish children of mixed marriages). It is estimated that about 10,000 Italian Jews were deported to Nazi concentration and extermination camps, of whom 7,700 were murdered in the Holocaust. The surviving community was able to maintain its distinctiveness throughout the following decades and continued to have a significant role in the fields of politics, literature, science and industry. Writers such as Giorgio Bassani, Natalia Ginzburg and Primo Levi were among the leading figures of the Italian culture in the post-war years. As of 2019, the estimated core Jewish population in Italy numbers around 45,000.

Italian migration to Israel 
The size of the Italian Jewish community has faced a slight but continuous drop throughout the postwar decades, partly because of emigration to Israel or the United States and partly because of low birth rates, assimilation and intermarriage, especially in the small congregations of the North. Italians in Israel mostly grew thanks to immigration during the 20th century. Aliyah - the symbolic ascent to Israel - has come in waves. During the period of the British Mandate, immigration to Palestine there were legal and economic limitations on immigration that were removed with the independence of the State of Israel and the promulgation of the Law of Return. Many Italkím arrived after the Italian racial laws promulgated by Fascist Italy from 1938 to 1943 to enforce racial discrimination in Italy, directed against the Italian Jews, then immediately after the Second World War, and after the Six Day War of 1967. In the first ten years of the 2000s, immigration had a new wave. In 2012 there were about 15,000 Italian citizens stablished in Israel.

Cooperation in the fight against terrorism and antisemitism 
Relations between Italy and Israel remain strong, with frequent diplomatic exchanges and a large volume of trade. The Israeli Government has followed with great attention the fight against international terrorism pursued by the Italian Government (also in the European arena: the decision of Riva del Garda to insert Hamas in the European list of organizations considered as terrorist). In 1986, terrorists attacked an Italian passenger liner, the fact is known as the Achille Lauro hijacking. Afterwards, Italy and Israel "recognizing the effective cooperation already existing between their respective countries", in the persons of the Minister of Police of the State of Israel and the Minister of the Interior of the Republic of Italy signed the Israel-Italy Agreement on the Struggle Against Terrorism, "Aware [...] of the need to realize in a more incisive way the coordination in the flow and analysis of information, and repression of international terrorism, the illicit trade in drugs and other forms of serious crime including organized crime." Israel was highly pleased with the agreement, the first in its kind with a major European power.

It has also been appreciated what the Italian Presidency has done in the framework of the United Nations on the Middle Eastern issues. Israel also welcomed the coherent and firm line of conduct, in contrasting the emergence of antisemitism in every possible form taken by the Italian government.

Cooperation in military and defense field 

The military and defense relations between the Italian Army and the Israel Defense Forces are strong. It is demonstrated by the several exercises and conferences between the higher ranks of the armies that occurred in the last decades in the field of defense, air force, military strategy and cyber security. There are also bilateral agreements for the acquisition and exchanges of military weapons and instruments.

The Israel Air Force (IAF) and the Italian Air Force concluded an extensive, two-week joint exercise in Sardinia 2010. The exercise was aimed at strengthening IAF operational capabilities and training its aircraft in large, unfamiliar airspaces along with foreign aircraft.

In July 2012, the two Governments signed a bilateral agreement for the supply to Israel of 30 advanced training aircraft Alenia-Aermacchi M-346 and related flight control operating systems. Italy received an OPTSAT-3000, a high-resolution optical satellite system for Earth observation and a NATO-standard communications subsystems for two aircraft of the Italian Air Force.

In summer 2014, the United States, Canada, Netherlands, Germany, United Kingdom, Poland, Italy and Greece sent their top air force commanders to Israel to learn about the air defense technologies behind the Iron Dome’s high rocket-interception rate. The conference was about the instability in Middle East.

In May 2015, air force commanders from around the world gathered in Israel to address the globalization of aerial threats. The first international air defense conference included representatives from Israel, Poland, Germany, Greece, the U.S, the U.K., Canada, Italy and the Netherlands.

In November 2017, the “Blue Flag” exercise took place. Throughout Blue Flag, air forces from the United States, Poland, Italy, Greece, India, France, and Germany simulated intense combat scenarios in realistic settings with the IAF.

In 2018 different events occurred to celebrate the IDF’s 70th Independence Day. The IAF held an aerial show featuring a collection of aircraft from the IAF, Israeli commercial airlines, the fire-fighting unit, and Israeli Police. The IDF’s military partners, including the Italian Aeronautica militare, joined the IAF aerial show, with fighter planes from Greece and Italy, and cargo aircraft from Poland, Canada, England, and Austria.

In May 2018 the Israeli Air Force hosted an international conference during which representatives from more than 20 different countries came together to discuss international cooperation and regional stability. The representatives were from the United States, Italy, Austria, Brazil, Belgium, India, Holland, Greece, Cyprus, the Czech Republic, Croatia, France, Romania, Finland, and other countries.

In June 2018, the IDF’s C4i and Cyber Defense Directorate held its first international digital and cyber security conference. About 70 foreign representatives attended the conference, including 6 generals and 16 colonels who deal with cyber and military defense technology. This is part of 13 delegations from 11 countries (South Korea, the United States, Austria, Britain, Canada, the Netherlands, Italy, Rwanda, Japan, Hungary, and Poland) all of which are united by technology.

The exchange of defense and security instruments between the two Countries have been continuing over these years with further agreements in February 2019 when Israel's Defense Ministry signed an agreement to procure seven advanced military training helicopters from the Italian government. In return for the Israeli purchase, the Italians have committed to acquiring defense and security materials from the Israeli government "within a similar scope." On 23 September 2020 Jerusalem purchased advanced training helicopters, and consequently Rome purchased spike missiles and simulators.

Economic relations 
Because of their geographical and cultural proximity, Israel and Italy are trade allies. Commercial and economic exchanges primarily concern high-tech and chemical industries, as well as food products. In 2020, Italy's exports to Israel were worth €2,455.58 million . In 2020, Israel exported €730.29 million to Italy. Until the beginning of 2020, the trend of exchange between the two countries was steadily increasing, but due to the COVID-19 pandemic, the trend started to decrease. Italy and Israel are two of the world's most powerful arms traders. Between 2014 and 2018, Israel was one of the most significant buyers of Italy's overall weapons export; indeed, Italy is Israel's third largest arms seller.

In 1955 the Israel-Italy Chamber of Commerce was founded as a non-profit association. In 1993 it was officially recognized by the Italian Government and it promotes commercial and diplomatic relations between the two States. The two Countries signed an Agreement for Research and Development Cooperation in Industrial, Scientific and Technological fields on June 13, 2000. Within this Agreement, the "Nineteenth Call for Proposals for Joint Industrial R&D Projects" was published.

On 22 September 2020, the Governments of Italy and Israel together with the Governments of Cyprus, Egypt, Greece, Jordan and Palestine established the East Mediterranean Gas Forum (EMGF) as a regional inter-governamental organization.

Tourism 
Tourism relations between Italy and Israel are intense. Every year 400,000 people from Israel visit Italy for tourism and business. Italy represents the 6° country for international visitors to Israel (after US, Russia, Germany, France, United Kingdom) with 190,000 people arrived in Israel in 2019, a growth of 27% compared to the 2018 and a growth of 77% compared to 2017 (the highest increment compared to all the other nations). Israel is easily reachable from the main cities of Italy with direct flights. Contemplating the stats of UNWTO and IATA, the flights from Italy are the 5° among the most crowded (after Turkey, Germany, France, Russia).

Cultural exchange 
Israelis frequently visit Italy for education, work, tourism, and scientific and artistic exchanges. In the last ten years 105 books of Italian authors were translated from Italian to Hebrew. A strong community of Italqim who have made aliyah to Israel have strengthened cultural ties and promoted Italian culture in the country.  The Italian Cultural Institute recently initiated and organized a series of activities in the Cultural Center of the Jews of Libyan extraction in Or Yehuda, where recently a course of the Italian language has been launched.

The two Countries signed a Cultural Agreement in Rome on 11 November 1971.

The Italian Embassy and the Italian Cultural Institute recently  stimulated the creation of a Friends of Italy association ("Amitei Italia") which consists of more than 15,000 people . In 2004 the negotiations for the new triennial protocol (2004–2007) of the Bilateral Accord in the Cultural Sector in force as of November 1971. The Italian Cultural Institute operates in Israel as of 1960 with its principal office at Tel Aviv and a separate section in Haifa. The Italian language is taught in various centers around the country. The total number of students studying in centers under the direct control of the Italian Cultural Institute In 2004 was 1500, in 150 courses with 30 teachers. If the Dante Alighieri Society courses are considered, the figure reached 2500 students.

Recently, the possibility of introducing the teaching of the Italian language in various high schools and academic institutes in Israel has been successfully negotiated. For the academic year 2005-2006 the Italian Cultural Institute in Tel Aviv opened three academic courses of Italian Culture and Language at the Interdisciplinary Center in Herzliya. Italian is taught in four of the seven universities in Israel, and Israeli students study medicine, law, science, politics, architecture, and art at Italian universities.

On 25 October 2012,  the "Italy-Israel Foundation for Culture and the Arts" was founded, to promote the values and the ideas shared by the two societies. The two Countries have a Program of Cooperation for the years 2020-2023.

See also 
 International recognition of Israel
 History of the Jews in Italy
 History of the Jews in the Roman Empire
 Holy See–Israel relations
 Italian Jews
 Jews of San Nicandro
 Israel–European Union relations

References

External links
 The Israel Italy Chamber of Commerce and Industry

 

 
Italy
Bilateral relations of Italy
Jewish Italian history